The 1982 Honduran Segunda División was the 16th season of the Honduran Segunda División.  Under the management of Néstor Matamala, C.D. Platense won the tournament after finishing first in the final round (or Cuadrangular) and obtained promotion to the 1983–84 Honduran Liga Nacional.

Final round
Also known as Cuadrangular.

Standings

Known results

References

Segunda
1982